The  is an annual professional road bicycle racing classic one-day race held in Okinawa Prefecture, Japan. It was first started in 1989 as an amateur race, but became professional in 1999. It became part of the UCI Asia Tour in 2005. Until 2007, it was a one-day race, billing itself as the longest single-day course in Japan, but was transformed into a two-day stage race in 2008, its UCI category changing from 1.2 to 2.2. In 2008, the first day was a criterium, but from 2009, it was changed to a time trial run on the streets of Nago. The 2010 edition extended the second stage to 210 kilometers. The 2012 edition again returned to a single-day event.

In addition to the main international champion race, there is also a women's and junior international race, as well as several amateur races.

Past winners

Men's winners

Women's winners

References

External links 
 
 
 Statistics at the-sports.org
 Tour de Okinawa at cqranking.com

Cycle races in Japan
UCI Asia Tour races
Recurring sporting events established in 1989
1989 establishments in Japan
Sports competitions in Okinawa Prefecture